Dover is a small incorporated fishing and lumbering village located in a small cove at the head of Freshwater Bay, Bonavista Bay, Newfoundland, Canada. Settled in the early 1890s it was originally known as Shoal Bay, presumably from its many shallow coves and inlets in the area. From the 1950s to the 1970 Shoal Bay was referred to as Wellington (Dover Post Office), whereas the local residents called it Dover.

The first census taken of the community was in 1891 when seventeen people were counted, both lumbermen and fisherman. By 1901 the population had grown to sixty-six people and by 1921 it had grown to 203. The 2016 Census reported that its population was 662 people. The mayor of Dover is Tony Keats.

Near Dover is a geological feature called the Dover Fault, a major break in the Earth's crust. It is the dividing line for Gondwana and Laurentia that was formed by the Iapetus Ocean. A song in the Broadway musical Come From Away takes place at the lookout over the fault.

Demographics 

See also
 List of cities and towns in Newfoundland and Labrador

References

External links
 History of Dover
 Community information
Dover - Encyclopedia of Newfoundland and Labrador, vol.1, p. 608-609.

Populated coastal places in Canada
Towns in Newfoundland and Labrador